Andrés Palacios (born 13 May 1975) is a Chilean actor.

Biography 
Palacios was born in Chile, but moved to Mexico when he was two years old. He had participated in various theatrical shows and telenovelas.

Filmography

Film

Television

Awards and nominations

References

External links 

1975 births
Living people
Chilean emigrants to Mexico
Mexican male telenovela actors
Male actors from Santiago
People educated at Centro de Estudios y Formación Actoral